Raymond J. "Ray" Moore (born 24 August 1946) is a former professional tennis player from South Africa. During his career he won eight doubles titles, finishing runner-up an additional 12 times in doubles. Moore participated in 12 Davis Cup ties for South Africa from 1967 to 1977, including the 1974 South African victory, posting a 12–10 record in singles and posting an 0–1 mark in doubles.

In 1981, Moore teamed with Charlie Pasarell to begin the tournament that eventually became the Indian Wells Masters at the Indian Wells Gardens. They started at La Quinta Resort and Club, moved to Grand Champions Hotel, and then in 2000 opened the new Indian Wells Gardens, which holds the ATP Masters BNP Paribus Open. Moore and Pasarell sold the tournament to Larry Ellison in 2009 and Moore became the tournament director/CEO for the new owner.

Remarks on female tennis and resignation
On March 22, 2016, Moore resigned as CEO of the Indian Wells Masters tennis tournament, after drawing outrage over his remarks about the roles of women in tennis:

Career finals

Doubles (8 titles, 13 runner-ups)

References

External links
 
 
 

South African people of British descent
Tennis players from Johannesburg
South African male tennis players
Living people
1946 births
White South African people